Lee Maurice Russell (November 16, 1875May 16, 1943) was an American politician from Mississippi.

He was born in Lafayette County, Mississippi, to William Eaton Russell and Louisa Jane (Mackey) Russell, and he later attended the University of Mississippi. During his time as a student, he was the leader in a movement to abolish Greek fraternities. Russell graduated from the university in 1901 and enrolled in the University of Mississippi School of Law. After completing the course, he was admitted to the bar and practiced law in Oxford, Mississippi.

Russell was elected to the Mississippi House of Representatives in 1907, representing Lafayette County from 1908 to 1912, and he was elected to the Mississippi State Senate in 1911, representing the 32nd district from 1912 to 1916. In 1912, he successfully passed a bill prohibiting secret and exclusive societies at the public institutions of higher learning. The law stayed on the books for twelve years.

Russell was elected to the office of lieutenant governor in 1915 and elected governor in 1919. Crop failures due to the boll weevil marked his term. Russell also filed an antitrust suit against several fire insurance companies for their business practices.

In 1923, he was sued for seduction and breach of promise by his former secretary Frances Birkhead. Russell was acquitted, and he blamed the lawsuit on the fire insurance industry.

Russell could not run for re-election due to the term limits in the Mississippi constitution. He retired to the Gulf Coast of Mississippi. There he sold real estate for a period before returning to Jackson to practice law until his death on May 16, 1943. He is buried at Lakewood Memorial Park in Jackson.

References

External links 
 Lee M. Russell's grave at Find-A-Grave
 Profile at National Governors Association website

1875 births
1943 deaths
Democratic Party governors of Mississippi
Democratic Party Mississippi state senators
Democratic Party members of the Mississippi House of Representatives
People from Lafayette County, Mississippi
University of Mississippi alumni
Methodists from Mississippi
American real estate brokers